Handels can be:
 Stockholm School of Economics
 Swedish Commercial Employees' Union